The 1998 Sydney to Hobart Yacht Race was the 54th annual running of the "blue water classic" Sydney to Hobart Yacht Race. It was hosted by the Cruising Yacht Club of Australia based in Sydney, New South Wales. It was the most disastrous in the race's history, with the loss of six lives and five yachts. 55 sailors were rescued in the largest peacetime search and rescue effort ever seen in Australia.

Background

The Sydney to Hobart Yacht Race is an annual event hosted by the Cruising Yacht Club of Australia, starting in Sydney, New South Wales on Boxing Day then heading south through the Tasman Sea, past Bass Strait, into Storm Bay and up the Derwent River, to cross the finish line in Hobart, Tasmania.

The race is run in co-operation with the Royal Yacht Club of Tasmania, and is widely considered to be one of the most difficult yacht races in the world.

1998 Race

The 1998 race, like every other edition, began on Sydney Harbour, at noon on Boxing Day (26 December 1998), with 115 starters heading south.  The yachts ranged in size from the  Sayonara to the  Berrimilla.
A favourable current running south at 4 knots with strengthening north to north-easterly winds of generally 25-35 knots prevailing off the NSW southern coast allowed a record-breaking dash south down the Australian East Coast. By early morning on 27 December, the lead yachts entered Bass Strait and began to encounter winds in excess of 40 knots. Of the 115 boats which started, 71 retired and 44 yachts completed the race.

Outright victory went to Sayonara, owned and skippered by Larry Ellison, with Lachlan Murdoch amongst the crew. The 35 foot AFR Midnight Rambler, skippered by Ed Psaltis, won on handicap. Never before had a boat of its size reached the entry to Bass Straight in less than a day.

Storm and rescue
On the second day of the race (27 December) severe weather conditions struck the fleet off the coast of south-eastern Australia. An unusually intense low pressure depression developed which resulted in unseasonal mid-summer snow across parts of south-eastern Australia. The weather system built into an exceptionally strong storm with winds in excess of 65 knots (+32.8 m/s, +118 km/h, +73 mph, Force 12) and gusts to 80 knots. The rising storm caused the sinking of five boats; seven were abandoned and 55 sailors had to be rescued from their yachts by ships and helicopters. Overall, the rescue efforts involved 35 military and civilian aircraft and 27 Royal Australian Navy vessels. It proved to be Australia's largest-ever peacetime rescue operation.

Deaths
The six sailors who died were: Phillip Charles Skeggs (Business Post Naiad, drowned, 27 December 1998); Bruce Raymond Guy (Business Post Naiad, heart attack, 27 December 1998); John Dean, James Lawler and Michael Bannister (Winston Churchill, all drowned, 28 December 1998); and Glyn Charles (Sword of Orion, drowned, 27 December 1998).

Aftermath

CYCA report

On 1 June 1999 the Cruising Yacht Club of Australia released the Report, Findings and Recommendations of the 1998 Sydney to Hobart Race Review Committee.  The report listed a multitude of recommendations and resulted in changes both for future Sydney to Hobart races and yachting events worldwide.

Coroner's inquest

A coroner's inquest into the deaths was critical of both the race management at the time and the Bureau of Meteorology.

The results of the inquest were released on 12 December 2000, NSW coroner John Abernethy finding that the Cruising Yacht Club of Australia had "abdicated its responsibility to manage the race". He wrote: "From what I have read and heard, it is clear to me that during this crucial time the race management team played the role of observers rather than managers and that was simply not good enough." But he acknowledged the club's actions to upgrade safety precautions and sailor qualifications.

Abernethy also criticised the Bureau for making insufficient efforts to inform race officials of a dramatically upgraded weather forecast about the severe storm developing south of Eden, when it was common public knowledge the race was scheduled to begin.  As a remedial measure, he required the Bureau to add maximum wind gust speed and wave height to its forecasts.

The day after the coroner's findings,  the club's race director, Phil Thompson, resigned his position. According to the coroner's report, "Mr Thompson's inability to appreciate the problems when they arose and his inability to appreciate them at the time of giving his evidence causes me concern that (he) may not appreciate such problems as they arise in the future."

1998 fleet
115 yachts registered to begin the 1998 Sydney to Hobart Yacht race. They were:

Results

Line Honours results (Top 10)

Handicap results (IMS Top 10)

See also
1979 Fastnet race A Yacht race severely affected by a rapidly deepening extratropical cyclone, near Ireland.
Turtling
UFO 34 (yacht)

References

Sources cited

External links
 
 
 

Sydney to Hobart Yacht Race
S
1998 in Australian sport
1999 in Australian sport
1998 meteorology
December 1998 sports events in Australia
January 1999 sports events in Australia
Maritime incidents in 1998
Maritime incidents in Australia
Maritime history of Tasmania
Shipwrecks of Tasmania
1998 disasters in Australia